A unit of volume is a unit of measurement for measuring volume or capacity, the extent of an object or space in three dimensions. Units of capacity may be used to specify the volume of fluids or bulk goods, for example water, rice, sugar, grain or flour.

Units 
According to the SI system, the base unit for measuring length is the metre. The SI unit of volume is thus the cubic metre, which is a derived unit, where:

1 m3 = 1 m • 1 m • 1 m.

Comparison

Forestry and timber industry

British Commonwealth 
 Hoppus, cubic foot measure used in the British Empire and, nowadays, some Commonwealth countries for timber.

Germany 
 Festmeter (fm), a unit of volume for logs
 Erntefestmeter (Efm), a unit of volume for trees or forests which assumes a 10% loss due to bark and 10% during the felling process.
 Vorratsfestmeter (Vfm), a unit of volume for trees or forests based on measurements including the bark.
 Raummeter (rm), or stere (stacked firewood) = 0.7 m3 (stacked woodpile with air spaces)
 Schüttmeter, or Schüttraummeter (piled wood with air spaces)

USA and Canada 
 Board foot, unit of lumber
 Cord, a unit of dry volume used to measure firewood and pulpwood
 Cubic yard, equal to

See also 
 Faggot (unit)
 History of measurement
 Orders of magnitude (volume)
 Metre Convention
 Physical quantity
 Tonne (unit)

References

External links